The Korgis are a British pop band known mainly for their hit single "Everybody's Got to Learn Sometime" in 1980. The band was originally composed of singer/guitarist/keyboardist Andy Davis (born Andrew Cresswell-Davis 10 August 1949) and singer/bassist James Warren (born 25 August 1951), both former members of 1970s band Stackridge, along with violinist Stuart Gordon and keyboardist Phil Harrison.

Career
The Korgis released their first single "Young 'n' Russian" in early March 1979 on the label Rialto Records, owned by their managers Nick Heath and Tim Heath. Joined briefly by drummer Bill Birks; their next single "If I Had You," was released soon after and moved up to number 13 on the UK Singles Chart, featuring on Top of the Pops and prompting the release of an eponymous debut album, The Korgis, in July 1979.

The follow up singles a re-release of "Young 'n' Russian" and "I Just Can't Help It" failed to chart. However the next single, from their second album Dumb Waiters (1980) was "Everybody's Got to Learn Sometime" (1980), a number one hit in three countries, France. Spain and Switzerland, peaking at number 5 in the UK, 18 in the US and 11 in Australia. It was also a top ten in Belgium, Holland and Italy. The album reached number 40 in the UK in 1980 and was followed by the singles "If It's Alright with You Baby" and "Rovers Return". 

The commercial breakthrough that accompanied the release of their second album and the resulting singles was not enough to keep them together, however, and Davis departed the band prior to the recording of their third album, Sticky George, despite having a number of songwriting credits on the album. The lead single from Sticky George, "That Was My Big Mistake", was released under the name 'James Warren & the Korgis' to denote the fact that Davis and Warren had now gone their separate ways. By the end of 1980, Gordon and Harrison had also departed the band; subsequently the band was augmented by the arrival of guitarist John Baker, drummer Roy Dodds, and keyboardist Maggie Stewart. This line-up went on to promote "Everybody's Got to Learn Sometime" and subsequent singles on European TV and promotional appearances.

The following year the band was joined by flautist Steve Buck and was contemplating a Korgis Live show that ultimately failed to materialise; leading the band to dissolve and Warren to go solo in 1982. The single "Don't Look Back", originally a demo from the Sticky George sessions, was however remixed by Trevor Horn, known for his work with The Buggles, Frankie Goes to Hollywood, Dollar and Yes, and issued by London Records in the summer of 1982. A follow-up single with Horn, "Endangered Species", was planned but never materialised.

Warren went on to issue a solo LP entitled Burning Questions in 1986. Some of the singles during this era were released as 'the Korgis' (essentially a one-man band consisting solely of Warren during this period) and co-produced by Andy Davis. Davis released his own solo LP, Clevedon Pier, in 1989.

The band reunited in 1990 to re-record "Everybody's Got to Learn Sometime". The re-formed group, consisting of Warren, Davis, and Baker, released the album This World's For Everyone in 1992, having some success in Continental Europe and Japan, before breaking up again in 1993.

1999 saw the three original Korgis albums being re-issued by Edsel Records, followed by the two disc anthology Don't Look Back – The Very Best of The Korgis in 2003, issued by Sanctuary Records/Castle Communications.

In 2005, Warren, Davis, and Baker reunited again for a film shoot for DVD/compilation album Kollection, and recorded the fourteen-track album Unplugged, which was released on the Angel Air record label the following year.

In 2006, the Korgis released their first single in thirteen years, "Something About the Beatles". This song acknowledges the influences of John Lennon in particular, which was very strong on "If I Had You" and "Everybody's Got to Learn Sometime" which capture the ethereal sounds of Lennon's early 1970s output. The band acknowledged John Lennon's influence in interviews at the time, shortly before his murder.

Former member Stuart Gordon died on 28 August 2014 from lung cancer. He was 63.

When Stackridge took a break from touring in 2014; Warren and Davis organised a tour of the UK in 2015 under the name of the Korgis and using exactly the same five-piece line-up as Stackridge. The re-formed Stackridge usually included some Korgis songs in their live set. Stackridge retired in 2017, and a recording of the farewell concert was released as The Final Bow.

In 2017, Warren, encouraged by guitarist/arranger Al Steele, played some dates as James Warren and Friends. This included a Korgis set, and has led on to the first ever touring version of the Korgis - featuring James Warren. The first gig was at the Sunshine Festival in August 2018, and saw the return of John Baker plus Glenn Tommie from Stackridge (who also played on the original of "Everybody's Got to Learn Sometime"), and Al Steele from the 1990s touring band. During 2019, the band have played in Leeds, Shoreham, Bristol, and the 100 Club in London.

During the Covid lockdown in 2020, the Korgis began recording their first new album in close to 30 years. It was entitled Kartoon World and was released in 2021. The album has a common thread and is a return to the idea of a 'concept album'. In December 2021 the band played the new album in its entirety firstly in Abbotskerswell and then at the Rondo Theatre in Bath. Since then they have performed a string of dates combining old and new material. Reception of the album has been unanimously positive with some parties calling it a 'career high'. 

In 2021, the single "Bringing Back the Spirit of Love" became a top 10 hit in Mike Read's Heritage Chart, subsequent singles, "Always a Sunny Day" and "Lines" have also charted.

In early 2022, the Korgis were asked to release an album for the Japanese market. This is called Kool Hits, Kuriosities & Kollaborations and features some unreleased songs and the single "Always a Sunny Day" co-written and performed by the Korgis & Joe Matera. It also features re-recorded versions of the classic hits, plus some alternative mixes of some tracks from 'Kartoon World'.

Cover versions
In September 2004, Zucchero and Vanessa Carlton entered the French charts, with their cover version of "Everybody's Got to Learn Sometime" and had some success. That same year, Beck also covered the song for the Michel Gondry film Eternal Sunshine of the Spotless Mind. In 2003 it was included on Erasure's cover album Other People's Songs.

Other cover versions of "Everybody's Got to Learn Sometime" also took the song back into the UK Singles Chart over the years, most notably those by The Dream Academy (1987), Yazz (1994), Baby D (1995), Army of Lovers (1995) and German techno duo Marc et Claude (2000). In 1997 a cappella group The King's Singers recorded the track with lead vocals by James Warren. Tracey Ullman and Rod Stewart have also covered "If I Had You". Ginger of The Wildhearts performed "If I Had You" in 1998, as heard on the double album Grievous Acoustic Behaviour – Live at the 12 Bar.

The Soviet synthpop/synthwave act Forum also released a Russian language cover under the title ‘Falling Leaves’. Unlike much of their other output which saw limited release in some Western countries, this recording was made without prior agreement with the label (Asylum) or the band, and is virtually unknown outside of the former Soviet Union.

In 2005, Canadian musician-turned-record label executive Jaimie Vernon of Bullseye Records released his second solo album Time Enough at Last, which featured "Everybody's Gotta Learn Sometime".

Another version of "Everybody's Got to Learn Sometime" has been recorded by the Dutch band Krezip. In 2008, Dutch electro house producer Laidback Luke released a bootleg remix of "Everybody's Got To Learn Sometimes". Also in 2008, the Glasgow-based band Glasvegas covered the song; it was as the B-side of their single "Geraldine."

In 2008, Beck performed "Everybody's Got to Learn Sometime" at the O2 Wireless Festival in London's Hyde Park.

The Swedish artist known as 'The Field' released the album Yesterday and Today (2009), which included a cover of the song "Everybody's Got to Learn Sometime".

A version called "Need Your Lovin'" was created by Jungle producers NRG back in 1992, sampling the original Korgis track, of which Baby D did their own version.

In 2010, Sharon Corr, of The Corrs, released a version of "Everybody's Got to Learn Sometime" on her solo album Dream of You.

In 2011, Nicola Roberts included a version of the song on her debut album Cinderella's Eyes, released during the hiatus of pop band Girls Aloud.

Members

Current members
James Warren – bass, vocals, guitar, keyboards (1978–1982, 1985–1986, 1990–1993, 2005–present)
John Baker – guitar, vocals, keyboards  (1980–1982, 1990–1993, 2005–2014, 2017–present)
Al Steele – guitar (2017–present)
Paul Smith – drums (2017–present)
Nigel Hart – keyboards, (2019–present)
Jay Marshall – backing vocals (2017–present)
Emmy Rivers – backing vocals (2017–present)
Ava Volante – backing vocals (2017–present)

Former members
Andy Cresswell-Davis – guitars, vocals, keyboards, drums (1978–1980, 1990–1993, 2005–2007)
Glenn Tommey – keyboards, vocals (2015–2019)
Stuart Gordon – violin (1978–1980; died 2014)
Phil Harrison – keyboards (1978–1980)
Bill Birks – drums, acoustic guitar (1979)
Roy Dodds – drums (1980–1982)
Maggie Stewart – keyboards (1980–1982)
Steve Buck – flute, drums (1981–1982)

Former touring musicians
Eddie John – drums, vocals (2015)
Clare Lindley – violin, guitar, vocals (2015)

Discography

Studio albums

Compilation albums
The Best of The Korgis (1983)
The Best of & the Rest of The Korgis (1990)
Archive Series (1997)
Greatest Hits (2001)
Klassics – The Best of The Korgis (2001)
Don't Look Back – The Very Best of The Korgis (2 CD) (2003)Kollection (2005)

Live albums
Unplugged (2006)

Singles

Videography
Kollection (DVD)

See also
Stackridge
List of 1980s one-hit wonders in the United States

References

External links
Official Korgis website
Official Stackridge website
Record Co.

The Korgis, James Warren and Stackridge discography

English pop music groups
Musical groups established in 1978
English new wave musical groups
Musical groups from Bristol
Asylum Records artists
London Records artists
Warner Records artists